Sugarfree is an Italian pop-rock band formed in 2000, best known for the song "Cleptomania".

Career
The group formed in Catania in 2000 as a cover band. After enjoying some local success, they started producing new songs, having a large success in 2005 with the single "Cleptomania", which peaked on the first place at the Italian hit parade, was certified platinum and sold over 40,000 copies.

In 2006 the group entered the main competition at the 56th edition of the Sanremo Music Festival, reaching the semifinals with the song "Solo lei mi dà". In 2008 the lead vocalist Matteo Amantia left the band to pursue a solo career; he rejoined the band in December 2014.

Personnel

     Matteo Amantia Scuderi - vocals, guitars
     Carmelo Siracusa - bass guitars
     Giuseppe Lo Iacono - drums
     Giuseppe Nasello - guitars
     Massimo Caruso - keyboards
 
Former members
     Alfio Consoli  - vocals, guitars
     Luca Galeano - guitars
     Vincenzo Pistone  - keyboards
     Salvo Urzì  - guitars

Discography
Albums  
     2005 - Clepto-manie
     2008 - Argento
     2009 - In simbiosi (EP)
     2011 - Famelico

References

External links

Italian pop music groups
Living people
Musical groups established in 2000
Year of birth missing (living people)